Tryokhostrovskaya is a rural locality (a stanitsa) and the administrative center of Tryokhostrovskoye Rural Settlement, Ilovlinsky District, Volgograd Oblast, Russia. The population was 864 as of 2010. There are 22 streets.

Geography 
Tryokhostrovskaya is located in steppe, on the right bank of the Don River, 51 km south of Ilovlya (the district's administrative centre) by road. Zimoveysky is the nearest rural locality.

References 

Rural localities in Ilovlinsky District
Don Host Oblast